Leptirica (translation "The Butterfly") is a 1973 Yugoslav Made-for-TV horror film based on the story After Ninety Years (1880) written by Serbian writer Milovan Glišić. It was directed by the Serbian director Đorđe Kadijević. Leptirica was the first Serbian horror movie and is considered one of the top Serbian and former Yugoslav horror films. The movie was filmed in the village of Zelinje, near the river Drina, close to the city of Zvornik. The mill that appears in the movie is still in its original location.

Plot
An old miller hears strange sounds coming from the woods. While he sleeps, a millstone suddenly stops working and a strange human-like creature with black hands and long teeth and nails bites his neck.

After the opening scene, the film turns to a romance between a poor young man Strahinja (Petar Božović) and a beautiful girl Radojka (Mirjana Nikolić). Radojka is the daughter of landowner Živan (Slobodan Perović), who refuses to allow her to marry Strahinja. Disappointed, Strahinja leaves his village and goes to Zarožje. He meets peasants discussing the cursed mill and accepts their offer to become the new miller. He spends the night in the mill and survives the attack of the creature, finding out its name - Sava Savanović. The villagers visit the oldest woman in a neighboring village and ask her if there is a grave of someone called Sava Savanović somewhere nearby. After finding the place where his body is buried, they nail a stake through the coffin and a butterfly flies out of his mouth.

The peasants help Strahinja take Radojka from her home and bring her to Zarožje. During the night, while the villagers are preparing the wedding, Strahinja sneaks into his future wife's room while she is asleep. As he undresses her, he discovers a bloody hole under her breasts and realizes it is from  the stake they used to impale Sava's coffin. Radojka opens her eyes and transforms into a disgusting hairy creature which climbs onto Strahinja's neck while he is trying to run away. She leads him to Sava's grave where he manages to take the stake out of the coffin and impale her.

The film ends with Strahinja lying motionlessly on the ground and a butterfly in his hair moving its wings.

Cast
 Mirjana Nikolić as Radojka
 Petar Božović as Strahinja
 Slobodan Perović as Živan
 Vasja Stanković as Kmet
 Aleksandar Stojković as a peasant 
 Tanasaije Uzunović as The priest
 Ivan Đurđević as a peasant
 Branko Petković as a peasant
 Toma Kuruzović as Vule

See also 
 Cinema of Yugoslavia
 Cinema of Serbia
 List of films based on Slavic mythology
 Vampire film

References

External links
 Leptirica (Full Movie) on YouTube
 
 

1973 films
1973 horror films
Yugoslav horror films
Serbian television films
1970s Serbian-language films
Serbian horror films
Serbian drama films
Films based on Slavic mythology
Films directed by Đorđe Kadijević
Films set in Serbia
Films set in Yugoslavia
Films shot in Serbia
Vampires in film
Folk horror films